Spermacoce remota, the woodland false buttonweed, is a species of plant in the Rubiaceae. It is native to the southeastern United States (Texas, Florida, Georgia, Alabama), West Indies (Bermuda, Bahamas, Hispaniola, Puerto Rico, the Cayman Islands, Trinidad, Lesser Antilles, etc.), Mexico, Central America and South America. It is naturalized in Taiwan, Southeast Asia (Thailand, Vietnam, Malaysia, Indonesia), China (Guangdong), India, Sri Lanka, New Guinea, Mauritius and many other oceanic islands (including Hawaii and the Galápagos).
 
Spermacoce remota is a perennial herb or sub-shrub up to 70 cm tall. Stems are either round or square in cross-section. Leaves are lanceolate, up to 5 cm long. Flowers are small, white, in a clump at the top of the stem. This herb is a common ground for oviposition of butterfly eggs, such as those of Anartia fatima.

References

External links
Atlas of Florida Vascular Plants Spermacoce remota
Nature Love You (Singapore), Spermacoce remota
Australian Tropical Rainforest Plants, Spermacoce remota
Pacific Island Ecosystems at Risk,Spermacoce remota 
Encyclopedia of Life Spermacoce remota
Landscape Plants for South Florida Spermacoce remota

remota
Flora of the United States
Flora of Mexico
Flora of South America
Flora of the Galápagos Islands
Flora of Hawaii
Plants described in 1792